Harold Francis Riley DL (born 21 December 1934), is an English artist. He sold his first painting to the Salford Museum and Art Gallery when he was 11.

Biography
Riley attended Salford Grammar School. In 1951 he won a scholarship to the Slade School of Fine Art, University College, London. After a one-year postgraduate course at the Slade he won a travel scholarship to Italy, followed by a British Council Scholarship to study in Spain, and went on to study in Florence and Spain before returning to Salford, where he has lived ever since. He completed his National Service as an officer in 1957. 
In 1960 Riley returned to Salford, where he still lives and works. He believed his main work was to document the city and his life-cycle in Salford in paintings, drawings and photographs.
His deep affection for his home town cemented a friendship with L.S. Lowry, which began when Riley was a student.
Riley has been awarded honorary doctorates by the universities of Salford, Manchester, London and Florence.
Riley's commissioned painted portraits include Prince Philip, Duke of Edinburgh, Prince Alexander of Yugoslavia, Princess Alice, Duchess of Gloucester, Pope John XIII, Pope Paul VI, Pope John Paul II, American Ambassador Elliot Richardson, United States presidents John F. Kennedy and Gerald Ford, and Nelson Mandela.

Riley is famous worldwide for his sporting pictures, particularly of golf and football. His golf images are in private and public collections throughout the world. His football paintings have centred largely on his links with Manchester United, with whom he played as a junior before going to university. The club has an extensive collection of his work, but the majority remains in his archive.

Thanks to Salford City Council, an archive and studio have been created for him in a conservation area around the old fire station on the Crescent in Salford. Here Riley will continue to work and his drawings, paintings and photographs of the city will be housed here, as well as his extensive collection of sports studies. A charitable trust, the Riley Educational Foundation, has been set up to look after his life's work.

In 2016 he published a limited-edition book, six years in the making and costing £17,500 per copy, recording the time he spent with South African President Nelson Mandela. Some of the 23 drawings he made of Mandela are reproduced. Money from the sale of the book would go to the Riley Educational Foundation, a registered charity set up to keep his work in Salford, and promote art in the north-west, including Salford schools.

Personal life 
Riley has been married twice. His first wife Hannelore died in 1973. They had one daughter, Kate, born in 1969. He married his second wife, Ashraf, in 1976 and their daughter Sara was born in 1977. The couple have three grandchildren.

He has served as a Deputy Lieutenant of Greater Manchester since 1984. He received the Freedom of the City of Salford on 15 November 2017.

References

External links
The Riley Archive

Salford Royal teams up with artist Harold Riley

English artists
1934 births
Living people
Alumni of the Slade School of Fine Art
People educated at Salford Grammar School
People from Salford
Deputy Lieutenants of Greater Manchester